Bnashii (also Bnashaai, Bneshaai, Bnechaai,  Bnash'i) is a village located in the Zgharta District in the North Governorate of Lebanon.

It has a leisure base around its artificial lake.

References

External links 
 Ehden Family Tree 
 Bnashii Lake On Google Maps Street View By Paul Saad

Zgharta District
Populated places in the North Governorate
Maronite Christian communities in Lebanon